Postua is a comune (municipality) in the Province of Vercelli in the Italian region Piedmont, located about  northeast of Turin and about  northwest of Vercelli.

Geography
Postua borders the following municipalities: Ailoche, Borgosesia, Caprile, Guardabosone, Scopa, and Vocca.

References

External links

Cities and towns in Piedmont